Costescu is a Romanian surname that may refer to:

Daniel Costescu (born 1976), former Romanian footballer
Grigore Costescu (born 1934), Romanian basketball player and Olympian
Nicolae Costescu (1888-1963), Romanian Brigadier-General during World War II
Theodor Costescu (1864–1939), Romanian educator and politician

Romanian-language surnames